Shout: The Very Best of Tears for Fears is a 2001 compilation album released by the British band Tears for Fears. The album contains the greatest hits of the band from their first album, The Hurting, to the much later Elemental. The liner notes contain various photographs which were researched by Jason Pastori and coordinated by Ryan Null.

Reception

In an AllMusic review, Jose F. Promis says "Shout: The Very Best of Tears for Fears provides an excellent overview of the band's key tracks" with the set improving upon their previous compilation (1992's Tears Roll Down) by including an additional five tracks. He concludes by stating it "stands as the definitive Tears for Fears collection".

Track listing

Personnel
Adapted from AllMusic.

Tears for Fears
Roland Orzabal – guitar, keyboards, vocals
Curt Smith – bass, keyboards, vocals
Ian Stanley – keyboards
Manny Elias – drums

Additional contributors
Chris Hughes – background vocals, drums
Oleta Adams – vocals
John Baker – background vocals
Mel Collins – saxophone
Phil Collins – drums
Randy Jacobs – guitar
Manu Katché – drums
Mark O'Donoughue – Wurlitzer
Caroline Orzabal – background vocals
Pino Palladino – bass
Simon Phillips – drums
Neil Taylor – guitar

References

Tears for Fears albums
2001 greatest hits albums
Mercury Records compilation albums